Procurement is the process of finding, agreeing terms and acquiring goods, services or works from an external source and may also refer to:

 Procuring (prostitution)
 Government procurement or public procurement, the procurement of goods, services or constructions on behalf of a public authority
 E-procurement
 Indirect procurement
 Military acquisition (Military Procurement)
 Sustainable procurement
 Organ procurement
 Procure-to-pay
 Syndicated procurement

See also
 Procuration
 Procuring (disambiguation)